The Toronto and Mimico Electric Railway and Light Company was incorporated in 1890, and operated the Mimico radial line in the Toronto area. The line started operation in 1892 as a short suburban line that later was extended to Port Credit. In 1904, the railway was acquired by the Toronto and York Radial Railway (T&YRR) and became the T&YRR Mimico Division. In 1922, the City of Toronto acquired the T&YRR and contracted Ontario Hydro to manage the four T&YRR lines including the Mimico line. In 1927, the TTC took over the operation of the Mimico line and extended its service eastward to Roncesvalles Avenue. In 1928, the TTC double-tracked the line from Humber to Long Branch and made that portion part of the Lake Shore streetcar line. The portion beyond Long Branch to Port Credit became the Port Credit line, and continued operation as a single-track radial line until its closure on February 9, 1935.

This article is more about the Mimico/Port Credit line than about the company that spawned it.

Timeline

Pre-T&YRR era (1890-1904)
Events prior to the merger creating the Toronto and York Radial Railway in 1904 

On 16 July 16, 1892, the Toronto and Mimico Electric Railway and Light Company (incorporated November 14, 1890) began initial service between Sunnyside and the Humber River. The electrified line operated along a single track with only open cars, two of which were double-deck. The line used Toronto gauge

On July 5, 1893, the Toronto Railway Company acquired controlling interest in the Toronto and Mimico Electric Railway and Light Company, after the latter became insolvent due to a decline in ridership during winter as the line had no closed cars. The ridership on the line at that time was mainly from summer excursions. The TRC introduced two closed cars, both former horse cars that had been motorized, and these were the only closed cars until 1896.

On July 10, 1893, the Toronto and Mimico Electric Railway and Light Company extended service from Humber River to Mimico Creek, and further to Etobicoke Creek (Long Branch) on September 29, 1893. The line ran on the north side of Lake Shore Boulevard with passing sidings at Park Lawn Road, Allen Avenue and Royal York Road. The line could now give summer service to Long Branch Park, which evolved into an amusement park in the 1890s.

On June 20, 1896, two open, double-deck cars (numbers 1 and 3) built went into service. Both cars were built by the TRC, and could each carry up to 96 passengers. In addition, the line already had two smaller double-deck cars (numbers 10 and 11) from a different manufacturer. The TRC also provided open motor car 301, converted from an open trailer. 

On June 13, 1897, the line started Sunday service, helping to increase summer excursion traffic. Growth in towns and villages along the route also increased ridership. 

For the fiscal year ending June 1902, the railway showed a profit.

In 1903, Toronto and Mimico Electric Railway and Light Company changed its name to the Toronto and Mimico Railway Company.

Mackenzie & Mann era (1904-1921)
Events when the Toronto and York Radial Railway was under the control of William Mackenzie and Donald Mann 
On August 1, 1904, the Toronto and Mimico Railway Company was merged into the Toronto and York Radial Railway becoming its Mimico Division, thus ending the Toronto Railway Company's involvement in suburban services.

West of the Etobicoke Creek, the line was on the south side of Lake Shore Road. A trip from Port Credit to Yonge Street would take 2 hours and cost 18 cents.

Hydro Electric era (1922-1927)
Events when the Toronto and York Radial Railway was managed by Hydro-Electric Railways
On August 16, 1922, the City of Toronto formally acquired the T&YRR lines. The plan was that the city portions of the T&YRR radial lines would be incorporated into the TTC, and the portions outside the city would be managed by Ontario Hydro as the Hydro-Electric Railways: Toronto and York Division. 
 
On November 1, 1922, Hydro-Electric Railways took over operation of the T&YRR lines outside of the city limits. The TTC replaced the radial line between Sunnyside and the Humber River with a double-track streetcar line. After 1922, Hydro changed the gauge of the Mimico line between Humber (the line's new eastern terminal) and Port Credit from Toronto gauge to standard gauge. HER introduced new standard-gauge cars and doubled service frequency.

From 1923 to 1926, ridership on the Mimico line decreased steadily from 3,760,299 to 2,325,701. Competing railway service could deliver passengers from Port Credit direct to Union Station in almost half the time at half the fare as taking the radial and transferring to a city streetcar at Humber.

TTC era (1927-1935)
Events when the TTC operated the Toronto and York Radial Railway lines 
 
On January 12, 1927, the Toronto Transportation Commission started operating the T&YRR lines under contract. Shortly after, the TTC converted the Mimico line from standard gauge back to Toronto gauge.

On November 21, 1927, the TTC extended the Mimico route eastwards to Roncesvalles Avenue.

On May 9, 1928, the Beach streetcar route was extended west to Humber Loop evenings, Saturday afternoons and Sundays, overlapping Mimico radial service.

As of September 28, 1928, the TTC split the Mimico line into two portions. The portion between Humber Loop and Long Branch Loop was double-tracked and became part of the Lake Shore streetcar route coming from downtown. The portion between Long Branch and Port Credit became the Port Credit line, a single-track radial line using older radial cars. The Port Credit line operated every 30 minutes even overnight.

On February 9, 1935, the Long Branch-Port Credit radial service ended, being replaced by bus service.

Postscript
On October 28, 1942, during World War II, a temporary double-track streetcar extension went into service from Long Branch Loop west to an armaments factory. Roughly following the route of the defunct Port Credit radial line, the "Small Arms Extension" ran for on the north side of Lakeshore Road over Etobicoke Creek via a highway bridge and terminated at a loop near the factory. Peter Witt streetcars served the extension. Service ceased by October 14, 1945 and the extension was removed thereafter.

Stations
 Mimico
 Long Branch
 Port Credit

Carhouses
 Carhouse built by the T&YRR near Grenadier Pond (1890s?-1927)
 Roncesvalles Carhouse (1927-1935)

Fleet
This is a partial description of the fleet:

See also

 List of Ontario railways
 List of defunct Canadian railways

References
 Toronto and York Radial Interurban

Passenger rail transport in Toronto
Rail transport in Mississauga
History of rail transport in the Regional Municipality of Peel
Transit agencies in Ontario
Defunct Ontario railways
Interurban railways in Ontario
4 ft 10⅞ in gauge railways
1892 establishments in Ontario
1935 disestablishments in Ontario
Canadian companies established in 1892
Electric railways in Canada
Standard gauge railways in Canada